Knabb is a surname. Notable people with the name include:

Ken Knabb (born 1945), American writer, translator, and theorist
Richard Knabb, American meteorologist

See also
Knabb-Bieber Mill, historic structure in Pennsylvania, United States
Knab (surname)
Knibb